Ribes colandina is a species of currant found only in Perú. Ribes colandina differs from Ribes andicola in uniformly dark red flowers (petals red, not orange-yellow as in R. andicola), black instead of yellow fruits and wider, more deeply lobed leaves.

Description
Inflorescences are terminal on short lateral shoots (brachyblasts); racemes pendent with a -long peduncle. The fruit is spherical, pendulous and black,  in diameter, with scattered shortly stalked glands.

Distribution
La Libertad, Cajamarca Department, Amazonas Department, Lambayeque Department and Piura Department. This new species replaces R. andicola south of the Ecuadorean border and appears to be widespread in Piura, Lambayeque, Cajamarca and La Libertad. Ancash Region does not harbour this species, where it is replaced by R. viscosum.

References

External links

colandina
Flora of Peru
Plants described in 2006
Dioecious plants